Panchakaran Union is an Union Parishad under Morrelganj Upazila of Bagerhat District in the division of Khulna, Bangladesh. It has an area of 72.86 km2 (28.13 sq mi) and a population of 21,009.

References

Unions of Morrelganj Upazila
Unions of Bagerhat District
Unions of Khulna Division